17th Reconnaissance Squadron may refer to:
 The 867th Reconnaissance Squadron, designated the 17th Reconnaissance Squadron (Light) from January 1941 to August 1941.
 The 407th Air Refueling Squadron, designated the 17th Reconnaissance Squadron (Heavy) from March 1942 to April 1942. 
 The 17th Special Operations Squadron, designated the 17th Reconnaissance Squadron (Bombardment) from April 1943 to April 1946. 
 The 17th Attack Squadron designated the 17th Reconnaissance Squadron from March 2003 to May 2016.

See also
 The 17th Photographic Reconnaissance Squadron
 The 17th Tactical Reconnaissance Squadron